Ross Ravenhill (born 2000) is an Irish hurler who plays for Offaly Championship club Durrow and at inter-county level with the Offaly senior hurling team. He usually lines out at midfield.

Career

Ravenhill first came to hurling prominence with the combined Ballinamere/Durrow club at juvenile and underage levels, before later joining the Durrow club's top adult team. He first appeared on the inter-county scene during a two-year stint with the Offaly under-20 team. Ravenhill made his senior debut during the 2020 National Hurling League.

Career statistics

Honours

Offaly
Christy Ring Cup: 2021
National Hurling League Division 2A: 2021

References

External links
Ross Ravenhill appearance record

2000 births
Living people
Offaly inter-county hurlers